The Utica Avenue station is an express station on the IND Fulton Street Line of the New York City Subway. Located at Utica Avenue and Fulton Street in Bedford–Stuyvesant, Brooklyn, it is served by the A train at all times and the C train at all times except late nights.

History
This underground station opened on April 9, 1936, as part of an extension of the Independent Subway System (IND) from its previous Brooklyn terminus at Jay Street–Borough Hall, which opened three years earlier, to Rockaway Avenue. The new IND subway replaced the BMT Fulton Street El. The Reid Avenue El station, which was originally named Utica Avenue and was formerly above the current subway station, closed on May 31, 1940.

Station layout

The station has four tracks and two island platforms, typical for a four-track express station. The outer track walls are made of tile and have a maroon trim line with a dark maroon border. Small black tile captions reading "UTICA" in white lettering on a black background run below the trim line at regular intervals. The station's I-beam columns are painted maroon, alternating ones having the standard black station name plate with white lettering. Renovations added looping maroon tile patterns at the mezzanine level, as well as the platform's floor pattern. Renovations also added new old-fashioned light fixtures with modern sodium-vapor lamps in them, which are suspended on long rods from the high, vaulted ceilings.

This station has two fare control areas, one at either end. The full-time side at the eastern (railroad south) end has two staircases from each platform going up to a crossover (the western ones go up to a ramp that leads to the main fare control area), where a turnstile bank and two exit-only turnstiles provide access to and from the station. Outside fare control, there is a token booth and two street stairs, each going to either western corners of Utica Avenue and Fulton Street.  The station's other fare control area has two staircases going down to each platform, a crossover, part-time turnstile bank and customer assistance booth, high entry/exit turnstiles that provide full-time access to and from the station, and two staircases going up to either side of Fulton Street between Stuyvesant and Schenectady Avenues.

Unusually, there are two mezzanine levels; the upper mezzanine level was closed off after a 1995 renovation, and the lower mezzanine level is actually the platform level of the unbuilt Utica Avenue line.

Between this station and Ralph Avenue, there is a fifth track between the express tracks, which could be used for storage or turning trains, although it is not normally used. The storage/layup tracks ends with bumper blocks on both ends, with a switch to the northbound express track on its west end and a switch to the southbound express track on the east end.

Artwork here was made in 1996 by Jimmy James Green and is called Children's Cathedral.

Unfinished station

The center of the station slopes down and there is a lowered ceiling compared to the rest of the station. Above is a disused portion of a mezzanine and an unfinished upper level station. The tracks are outlined by a pattern in the ceiling on top of the four trackways at the Utica Avenue station; therefore it appears that there are four trackways and two island platforms running diagonally across the ceiling in the center. The unfinished upper level station was to be built for a subway line down Utica Avenue as part of the IND Second System.

There were blocked stairways up from the platform level to the upper level that were removed during the station's renovation. Climbing the steps to the intermediate level, there are locked doors that serve as access to the unfinished platforms. There are also some windows in this level. Looking into the window reveals a cinder-block wall that were erected to prevent glimpses into the closed portion of the intermediate level mezzanine. Climbing the ramp to the entrance level reveals more windows and doors These doors provide access to the disused portion of the upper level mezzanine, which has steps leading to the disused portion of the intermediate level mezzanine (which in turn leads directly to the unfinished station).

Before the renovation of this station in 1995, it was possible to see the unfinished station from the mezzanine. In the intermediate level of the mezzanine, the closed section of the mezzanine was blocked only by a chain-link fence. Past the fence, there was a tiled wall with a door. The door had some panels missing, and whenever open, a look into the door revealed the unfinished upper level station. After the 1990s renovation of the Utica Avenue station, the mezzanine was shortened using cinder-block walls and the current tiling in the intermediate level, hiding the chain-link fence and the door behind it.

Exits

This station is compliant with the 1990 Americans With Disabilities Act. In May 2014, MTA installed three elevators: one near the intersection of Utica Avenue and Fulton Street, connecting the mezzanine to the street, and two elevators connecting the platforms to the mezzanine.

There are four stair entrances, all on Fulton Street:

South side of Fulton Street west of Utica Avenue, at Boys and Girls High School
 North side of Fulton Street west of Utica Avenue (staircase and elevator)
South side of Fulton Street west of Stuyvesant Avenue
North side of Fulton Street west of Stuyvesant Avenue

In popular culture
This station's mezzanine and exterior can be seen in various points of 6ix9ine’s music video for the song "Kooda".

References

External links 

 
 nycsubway.org — Children's Cathedral Artwork by Jimmy James Green (1996)
 Station Reporter — A Lefferts
 Station Reporter — A Rockaway
 Station Reporter — C Train
 Abandoned Stations: IND Second System unfinished stations
 The Subway Nut — Utica Avenue Pictures
 MTA's Arts For Transit — Utica Avenue (IND Fulton Street Line)
 Utica Avenue entrance from Google Maps Street View
 Stuyvesant Avenue entrance from Google Maps Street View
 Platforms from Google Maps Street View

IND Fulton Street Line stations
Bedford–Stuyvesant, Brooklyn
New York City Subway stations in Brooklyn
Railway stations in the United States opened in 1936
1936 establishments in New York City